Maccaffertium terminatum is a species of flatheaded mayfly in the family Heptageniidae. It is found in all of Canada.

Subspecies
These two subspecies belong to the species Maccaffertium terminatum:
 Maccaffertium terminatum placitum (Banks, 1910)
 Maccaffertium terminatum terminatum (Walsh, 1862)

References

Further reading

External links

 

Mayflies
Articles created by Qbugbot
Insects described in 1862